The 1969 Indian vice-presidential election was held on 30 August 1969. Gopal Swarup Pathak won the election to become the fourth Vice-President of India. The election was occurred since the sitting VP, Varahagiri Venkata Giri resigned to contest the presidential election after the death of incumbent President Zakir Husain.

Schedule
The election schedule was announced by the Election Commission of India on 31 July 1969.

Result
The Electoral College consisted of 759 members of Parliament of India. There were 6 contesting candidates and the counting of votes was taken up immediately after the conclusion of the poll. The result was declared after the first round of counting of first preference votes. Pathak was declared elected after getting 400 first preference votes.

See also
 1969 Indian presidential election

References

Vice-presidential elections in India
Vice President